Cthulhu Dice is a dice game released in 2010 by Steve Jackson Games. It is recommended for 2-6 players, and the play time can be anywhere from 5–10 minutes. The game includes a 12 sided die, 18 glass marbles, and a set of rules. Each player rolls the die to compete with other players to be the last sane person left.

Rules
Each player takes three glass marbles to represent sanity, and the rest of the tokens are set aside.
A person will cast the die, rolling it against another player, causing him/her to lose or gain sanity.

Signs
Cthulhu Dice uses many signs on the custom die that represent moves of the players. The signs are: Yellow Sign, Tentacle, Elder Sign, Cthulhu or an Eye of Horus. The signs used in Cthulhu Dice are famous glyphs from H. P. Lovecraft's Cthulhu Mythos.

See also
Game design

References

External links
http://www.sjgames.com/dice/cthulhudice/
http://www.sjgames.com/dice/cthulhudice/img/CDRules_English.pdf

Board games introduced in 2010
Dice games
Steve Jackson (American game designer) games
Steve Jackson Games games